Faouzia Ouihya (born 5 July 2000), known mononymously as Faouzia, is a Moroccan-Canadian singer-songwriter and musician best known for her track "Tears Of Gold". Born in Morocco, she moved with her family to Canada at a young age. During that time she learned how to play various instruments, and began composing her first songs. She released several singles and collaborated with many musicians on vocals and songwriting prior to releasing her debut extended play (EP), Stripped, in August 2020.

Life and career

2000–2014: Early life
Faouzia Ouihya was born in Casablanca, Morocco and moved with her family at the age of one to Notre-Dame-de-Lourdes, Manitoba in Canada, before settling in the rural town of Carman, Manitoba. She has two sisters: Samia (one of her managers) and Kenza (her photographer). She was raised Muslim and often traveled to her native country. Faouzia said she feels "very connected to the country and the region [North Africa]. Even though I grew up in Canada, I grew up eating Moroccan food, [and] wearing Moroccan attire." In an interview she revealed she felt excluded as a child, saying "maybe not just fitting in is the biggest thing I've had to overcome". Her first composition was inspired by this feeling of exclusion, in which she embraced people's differences. Her passion for music began at the age of four when she watched her sister Samia playing the piano, wishing she could learn how to play it. Faouzia began writing songs and poems when she was five years old and playing piano at the age of six. She later studied how to play guitar and violin. She speaks fluent English, French, and Arabic; the latter being the one she mostly used with her family.

2015–2019: Career beginnings
At the age of fifteen, she won Song of the Year, the Audience Award, and Grand Prix at the 2015 La Chicane Éléctrique. She began posting her songs and other covers on YouTube which led to a contract with Paradigm Talent Agency. Thanks to her early success, she released her debut single "Knock on My Door" on 1 November through various platforms.

In 2016, she won second place in the Canada's Walk of Fame Emerging Artist Mentorship Program. In 2017, she was the recipient of the Grand Prize at the Nashville Unsigned Only music competition. The same year, she collaborated with fellow Manitoban artist Matt Epp on their single "The Sound", and won the International Songwriting Competition, the largest songwriting competition in the world. The two are the first Canadians in competition's 16-year history to win the top prize, beating 16,000 other entries from 137 countries. She performed with the Winnipeg Symphony Orchestra at The Forks, Winnipeg celebrating the 150th anniversary of Canada.

Faouzia is featured in the song "Battle" on David Guetta's studio album 7, announced on 24 August 2018. In a French language interview with Le Matin, Guetta noted Faouzia's "great voice, powerful vibrato, and unique style" for why he chose her for his album. Faouzia recalled she "was still in high school when I heard the news that there was a possibility of me working with him", and affirmed it was "one of my proudest career moments, so far." At that time, she enrolled in the University of Manitoba, majoring in computer engineering. She also featured in the song "Money" on French rapper Ninho's studio album Destin and the song got certified "Gold Single" on 9 July 2019.

2020–present: Stripped and  Citizens
In early 2020, she was invited by Kelly Clarkson to translate her song "I Dare You" to Moroccan Arabic, which was released on 16 April. About a month later, the Swedish EDM duo Galantis invited her to feature in their song "I Fly" for the soundtrack of the movie SCOOB!.

Faouzia released her first extended play (EP), Stripped, on 6 August 2020. It features 6 stripped (acoustic version) songs, 5 of which were previously released, and one of which, "100 Bandaids", is a new track. To promote the EP, Faouzia performed the tracks live in a concert at the Burton Cummings Theatre on 20 August.

On 5 November 2020, she released the single "Minefields" alongside American singer-songwriter John Legend. In July 2021, Faouzia revealed that she has been working on her debut studio album for a few years. She also released the singles "Don't Tell Me I'm Pretty", "Hero" , "Puppet" and "RIP, Love". On May 19, 2022, Faouzia released her second EP, Citizens.

Artistry

Musical style and themes 
Faouzia is a pop, R&B, synth-pop, and acoustic pop artist. She has described her music as "emotional" and "intense". Her early songwriting was heavily inspired by people she was close to. However, her later songs were more personal since she "really wanted my heart in my story." Gloria Morey noted that her music has "the musical elements of upbeat pop songs which often contain quite shallow lyrics, but Faouzia’s lyrics are very meaningful and, well, the opposite of shallow.” Faouzia possesses a potential coloratura mezzo-soprano vocal range that spans from C♯ 3 to G5 in mixed voice and A6 in whistle tones. Faouzia sings mostly in English language, featuring Arabic tonalities in her vocals. She has also performed in Arabic and in French language.

Influences 
Faouzia cites her parents and sisters as her biggest influence in pursuing a music career. She grew up listening to pop musicians Rihanna, Lady Gaga, Ariana Grande, Rosalía, Beyoncé, Sia, Adele, Kelly Clarkson, and John Legend. About Rihanna, she said "has always been an inspiration of mine growing up and still to this day." Faouzia added that she, Beyoncé, Lady Gaga, and Sia are her mayor influences as a songwriter. She told that "Say Something" by A Great Big World featuring Christina Aguilera and "Hello" by Adele are some of her favourite songs. At a young age she listened alongside her parents to Arab music acts such as Umm Kulthum and Fairuz. Faouzia declared they "are two of my all-time favourite artists." She also listened to Assala Nasri and Khaled. When she was learning music she listened to composers Chopin, Bach, and Mozart. Pop rock bands Fall Out Boy and Imagine Dragons have also served as influences for her, and she attended one of the latter's concerts.

Discography

Extended plays

Singles

As lead artist 

Notes

As featured artist

Videography

References

External links 
 
 
 
 
 Faouzia on Spotify

Canadian women singer-songwriters
2000 births
21st-century Canadian women singers
21st-century Moroccan women singers
Franco-Manitoban people
Living people
Moroccan emigrants to Canada
Musicians from Manitoba
People from Casablanca